Jianchangopterus is a genus of scaphognathine rhamphorhynchid pterosaur from the Middle Jurassic of western Liaoning, China. Jianchangopterus is known from a nearly complete skeleton with skull preserved. It was collected from the Tiaojishan Formation. It was first named (after Jianchang County) by Lü Junchang and Bo Xue in 2011 and the type species is Jianchangopterus zhaoianus.

See also
 List of pterosaur genera
 Timeline of pterosaur research

References

Middle Jurassic pterosaurs of Asia
Rhamphorhynchids
Fossil taxa described in 2011
Taxa named by Lü Junchang
Paleontology in Liaoning